Chatham Central High School is a public high school located in Bear Creek, North Carolina with a student population of around 400 students. It is part of Chatham County Schools.

The FFA team usually goes to the national convention.

References

Schools in Chatham County, North Carolina
Educational institutions established in 1959
Public high schools in North Carolina
1959 establishments in North Carolina